Elizabeth of Leiningen,  (died 20 June 1235/38), was a countess of the House of Leiningen and by marriage countess of Nassau. As widow she used the title countess of Schowenburg.

Life 

Elizabeth was a daughter of Count Emich III of Leiningen. She married in or before 1169 to Rupert III ‘the Bellicose’ of Nassau (died 23/28 December 1191). From this union came the following children:
 Herman (died 16 July before 1206), count of Nassau 1190–1192.
 Lucardis (died before 1222), she married before 27 February 1204 to Herman III, Count of Virneburg (died after 1254).
Elizabeth's husband is mentioned as count of Nassau between 1160 and 1190. He took part in the Third Crusade (1189–1190) with Emperor Frederick I Barbarossa. It seems that he stayed until the end of the siege of Akko and then died on the way back at sea.

‘’ sold property to Johannisberg Abbey with consent of ‘’ by charter dated 27 February 1204.

At the death of her brother Count Frederick II of Leiningen  Elizabeth inherited one third of Schaumburg Castle near Balduinstein and its Herrschaft. After her death her part came into the possession of her grandsons, the Counts Rupert I and Henry I of Virneburg.

‘’ donated property to Limburg Cathedral in a charter dated 1235.

The necrology of Arnstein Abbey records the death of ‘’ on 20 June.

Notes

References

Sources 
 This article was translated from the corresponding Dutch Wikipedia article, as of 2020-12-18.
 Cawley, Charles: Nassau in: Medieval Lands. A prosopography of medieval European noble and royal families
 Cawley, Charles: Palatinate in: Medieval Lands. A prosopography of medieval European noble and royal families
 
 
 
 
 
 

Countesses of Nassau
Leiningen family
12th-century women of the Holy Roman Empire
13th-century women of the Holy Roman Empire
Year of birth unknown
Year of death unknown